Batch may refer to:

Food and drink 
 Batch (alcohol), an alcoholic fruit beverage 
 Batch loaf, a type of bread popular in Ireland
 A dialect term for a bread roll used in North Warwickshire, Nuneaton and Coventry, as well as on the Wirral, England
 Small batch, bourbon whiskey blended from selected barrels
 Wiser's Small Batch, a Canadian whisky made in limited batches by Corby Distillery Ltd, Belleville, Ontario, Canada

Manufacturing and technology 
 Batch distillation, the use of distillation in batches
 Batch oven, a furnace used for thermal processing
 Batch production, a manufacturing technique
 Batch reactor, a type of vessel widely used in the process industries
 Fed-batch, a biotechnological batch process
 Glass batch calculation, the determination of the correct mix of raw materials for a glass melt
 Sequencing batch reactor, an industrial processing tank for the treatment of wastewater
 Batching & mixing plants, used in concrete production

Computer science 
 Batch (Unix), a command to queue jobs for later execution
 Batch Enhancer, an applet launched by Norton Utilities to graphically enhance the presentation of batch files
 Batch file, a text file containing a series of commands intended to be executed in DOS, OS/2, and Microsoft Windows
 Batch Monitor, a software program created by Apple Computer for viewing and monitoring encoding tasks
 Batch processing, the execution of a series of programs on a computer without human interaction
 Batch renaming, the process of renaming multiple computer files and folders in an automated fashion
 DEC BATCH-11/DOS-11, a computer operating system developed by Digital Equipment Corporation
 Portable Batch System, computer software that performs job scheduling
 Spring Batch, an open source framework for batch processing
 Batch learning, a machine learning technique

People 
 Baron Batch (born 1987), American football running back
 Emil Batch (1880–1926), American baseball player
 Colin Batch (born 1958), Australian hockey player
 Charlie Batch (born 1974), American football quarterback

Places 
 Barns Batch Spinney, a geological Site of Special Scientific Interest near Dundry, Somerset, England
 Beacon Batch, the summit area of Black Down, the highest hill in the Mendip Hills, Somerset, England
 Beardly Batch, a hamlet in the parish of Pilton, Somerset, England

Miscellaneous 
 Batch (album), an album by pop-punk band Big Drill Car
 Bach (New Zealand), pronounced "batch", a type of beach holiday home found in New Zealand

See also
Basch, a surname
Batsch (disambiguation)